Luis Martínez Aguilar (born 3 April 1999) is a Mexican professional footballer who plays as a defender for Spanish club Salamanca UDS.

Club career
On 7 October 2018, Martínez made his official debut in the Liga MX with Tijuana against Querétaro.

On 13 September 2020 he joined to Segunda División B club Salamanca.

References

External links

1999 births
Living people
Footballers from Chihuahua
Association football defenders
Liga MX players
Club Tijuana footballers
Segunda División B players
Salamanca CF UDS players
Mexican expatriate footballers
Mexican expatriate sportspeople in Spain
Expatriate footballers in Spain
Mexican footballers